Springville is a ghost town in Darlington County, South Carolina, United States. There was a post office in operation from 1826 until 1832.

It is the location given in the National Register of Historic Places for six places (all registered on October 10, 1985):
Arthur Goodson House
John L. Hart House (Springville, South Carolina)
Evan J. Lide House
John W. Lide House
White Plains (Springville, South Carolina)
Wilds Hall

See also
National Register of Historic Places listings in Darlington County, South Carolina

References

External links

Geography of Darlington County, South Carolina
Ghost towns in South Carolina